Concrete Angels is a Canadian musical drama film, directed by Carlo Liconti and released in 1987. Set in 1964, the film centres on a group of teenagers in a working class ethnic neighbourhood in Toronto, Ontario. After a radio station announces a battle of the bands competition whose prize will be the opportunity to open for The Beatles at Maple Leaf Gardens, the boys form a band with the hopes of winning the competition.

The film stars Joseph Di Mambro as Bello, the band's leader and singer; Omie Craden as Ira, the drummer; Luke McKeehan as Sean, the guitarist; and Tony Nardi as Sal, Bello's uncle who owns the neighbourhood pool hall.

Nardi received a Genie Award nomination for Best Supporting Actor at the 9th Genie Awards.

References

External links

1987 films
Canadian musical drama films
English-language Canadian films
Films set in Toronto
Films shot in Toronto
1980s musical drama films
1987 drama films
Canadian rock music films
1980s English-language films
1980s Canadian films